Catocala toropovi is a moth in the family Erebidae. It is found in Kazakhstan.

References

toropovi
Moths of Asia
Moths described in 2014